Sceloporus subpictus, the southern cursorial lizard or paintbelly spiny lizard, is a species of lizard in the family Phrynosomatidae. It is endemic to Mexico.

References

Sceloporus
Endemic reptiles of Mexico
Reptiles described in 1965
Taxa named by Hobart Muir Smith